The following are the national records in Olympic weightlifting in Sri Lanka. Records are maintained in each weight class for the snatch lift, clean and jerk lift, and the total for both lifts by the Sri Lanka Weightlifting Federation.

Men

Women

References

Sri Lanka
weightlifting